Protermitobia is a aleocharine genus in the tribe Termitopaediini.

References

Aleocharinae genera
Aleocharinae